Alma Lake is an unincorporated community in southeastern Jackson Township, Parke County, in the U.S. state of Indiana.

History
The community took its name from the nearby lake at Alma Creek.

Geography

References

Unincorporated communities in Indiana
Unincorporated communities in Parke County, Indiana